Bunker Tower is a native rubble stone building serving as an observation tower on Cheaha Mountain in Cleburne County, Alabama's Cheaha State Park. The tower is located on Cheaha's tallest peak. The tower, built in a rustic architectural style, was completed in 1934 by the Civilian Conservation Corps. Park offices and a gift shop originally occupied the first floor wings connected to either side of the  tower.

The tower is immediately adjacent to a tall Alabama Public Television WCIQ transmitter tower which aids as a landmark among the trees and foliage atop Mount Cheaha.  Bunker Tower was added to the Alabama Register of Landmarks and Heritage on December 15, 1989.

References

Properties on the Alabama Register of Landmarks and Heritage
Buildings and structures in Cleburne County, Alabama
Towers in Alabama
Civilian Conservation Corps in Alabama
Towers completed in 1934
1934 establishments in Alabama